Killers from Space (a.k.a. The Man Who Saved the Earth) is a 1954 independently made American black-and-white science fiction film, produced and directed by W. Lee Wilder (brother of Billy Wilder), that stars Peter Graves, Barbara Bestar, Frank Gerstle, James Seay, and Steve Pendleton. The film originated as a commissioned screenplay from Wilder's son Myles Wilder and their regular collaborator William Raynor.

Lee Wilder's production company, Planet Filmplays, usually producing on a financing-for-distribution basis for United Artists, wound up making this film for RKO Radio Pictures distribution.

Plot
Dr. Douglas Martin (Peter Graves) is a nuclear scientist working on atomic bomb tests. While collecting aerial data on a United States Air Force (USAF) atomic blast at Soledad Flats, the pilot loses control of their aircraft and they crash. Dr Martin appears to have survived, unhurt, walking back to the air base with no memory of what happened. On his chest is a strange scar that was not there before the crash.

At the base hospital, Martin acts so strangely that the USAF brings in the FBI to investigate, thinking he might be an impostor. He is eventually cleared but told to take some time off. Martin protests being excluded from his project while on leave.

When an atomic test is set off without his knowledge, Martin steals the data, then goes back to Soledad Flats and places the information under a stone. An FBI agent follows him, but Martin is able to elude him until he crashes his car. Now back at the hospital, he is given truth serum. Deep under the drug's influence, Martin tells a story about being held captive by space aliens, led by Denab, in their underground base. The aliens, with large, bulging eyes, are from the planet Astron Delta, ruled by a being called The Tala. They had revived his lifeless body as he had died in his aircraft.

The aliens plan to exterminate humanity using giant insects and reptiles, grown with the radiation absorbed from our own atomic bomb tests. Martin intuits that the aliens use stolen electric grid power to control their powerful equipment. This so that the A-bomb's released energy levels can be predicted and then balanced. The aliens wiped his memory and hypnotized him into collecting the data for them.

The FBI agent (Steve Pendleton) and the base commander (James Seay) are skeptical of this incredible story and keep him confined at the hospital. Nevertheless, the attending physician says that Martin genuinely believes that what he told them is true.

With calculations made using a slide rule, Martin determines that if he shuts off the power to Soledad Flats for just 10 seconds, it will create an overload in the aliens' equipment. So he escapes from the hospital and goes to the nearby electrical power plant, where he forces a technician to turn off the power. After 10 seconds, the alien base is destroyed in a massive explosion, saving the Earth from conquest.

Cast

 Peter Graves as Dr. Douglas Martin
 Barbara Bestar as Ellen Martin
 Frank Gerstle (as Frank Gerstel) as Dr. Curt Kruger
 James Seay as Col. Banks
 Steve Pendleton as FBI Agent Briggs
 Shepard Menken (as Shep Menken) as  Major Clift, M.D.
 John Frederick (as John Merrick) as Deneb and The Tala
 Jack Daly as Powerhouse Supervisor
 Burt Wenland as Sgt. Bandero
 Ruth Bennett as Miss Vincent
 Ron Gans (as Ron Kennedy) as Sentry Sergeant Powers
 Lester Dorr as Gas Station Attendant
 Mark Scott as Narrator
 Ben Welden as Tar Baby 2 Pilot
 Roy Engel as 1st Police Dispatcher (uncredited)
 Coleman Francis as Power Plant Phone Operator (uncredited)
 Robert Roark as Unspecified Guard

Production
Under the working title of The Man Who Saved the Earth, production took place from early- to mid-July 1953 at KTTV Studios. Scenes featuring the cavern hideout of the aliens were shot in Bronson Canyon in Los Angeles.

The effect for the aliens in the film was done by Harry Thomas. He was told to make large eyes for them, albeit on a cheap budget, since glass eyes would have cost too much. Needing an idea, he found it while looking in his refrigerator: plastic egg trays, of which he used the top portion by cutting it with a heated screwdriver. He then cut little holes with the screwdriver. Owing to a lack of further time meant that he did not do further work that he would have liked to do, such as sealing the sides with cotton.

Reception and legacy
Killers from Space was released as a B-movie, hampered by low production values and a minuscule budget.

In 2006, film reviewer Thomas Scalzo also noted: "Killers From Space is an enjoyable, if slow-going, sci-fi / horror diversion, and if these killers from space had somehow found a way to stop their yammering long enough to get on with some actual killing, the combination of Peter Graves, mutant insects and amphibians, a palpable atmosphere of ’50s atomic fear, and the directorial efforts of Billy Wilder’s brother, would have been enough to bump the film into the upper echelon of early sci-fi essentials".

In 2006 skeptic Dr. Aaron Sakulich noted similarities between the film and many alien abduction stories that would first appear over a decade later, such as the medical testing done by the aliens, the protagonist's strange scar, his memory erasure, the aliens' giant eyes, and their way of mind control.

In 2007, The Film Crew, consisting of Bill Corbett, Kevin Murray and Michael J. Nelson from the cult TV series Mystery Science Theater 3000, mocked the film in its entirety. They revisited the film in 2019 with new commentary under the Rifftrax banner.

See also
 Don't Ask Don't Tell, a comically redubbed version of this film.
 1954 in film

References

Bibliography

 Johnston, Keith M. Science Fiction Film: A Critical Introduction. London: Bloomsbury Academic, 2011. .
 Warren, Bill. Keep Watching the Skies: American Science Fiction Films of the Fifties, 21st Century Edition. Jefferson, North Carolina: McFarland & Company, 2009. .

External links

 
 
  (without tinting)
  (with green tinting)

1954 films
1954 horror films
Alien abduction films
American science fiction horror films
1950s science fiction films
1950s science fiction horror films
RKO Pictures films
American black-and-white films
1950s monster movies
American monster movies
Films directed by W. Lee Wilder
1950s English-language films
1950s American films